Jarilla is a municipality located in the province of Cáceres, Extremadura, Spain. According to the 2013 census (INE), the municipality has a population of 152 inhabitants.

References

External links
 
 Website of municipality

Municipalities in the Province of Cáceres